East Worthing railway station is an unstaffed railway station in Worthing in the county of West Sussex. It is  down the line from Brighton. The station is operated by Southern.

Built to serve the growing settlement at East Worthing, the station was opened in 1905 as Ham Bridge Halt, taking the name of the road bridge at the eastern end.

The station has ticket issuing facilities through one Shere FASTticket self-service ticket machine on the eastbound platform. A Permit to travel machine is on the westbound platform. The station has one glass and metal shelter on each platform.  In the early 1990s a small wooden ticket office building on the eastbound platform was demolished.

The platforms can only accommodate 4-coach trains.

Services
All services at East Worthing are operated by Southern using  EMUs.

The typical off-peak service in trains per hour is:
 2 tph to 
 1 tph to 
 1 tph to 

References

External links

Picture of HamBridge Halt when new

Buildings and structures in Worthing
Railway stations in West Sussex
DfT Category F1 stations
Former London, Brighton and South Coast Railway stations
Railway stations in Great Britain opened in 1905
Railway stations served by Govia Thameslink Railway